Katalin Gyulai is a Hungarian sprint canoer who competed from the mid-1980s to the early 1990s. She won three medals in the K-4 500 m event at the ICF Canoe Sprint World Championships with two silvers (1989, 1991) and a bronze (1985).

References

Hungarian female canoeists
Living people
Year of birth missing (living people)
ICF Canoe Sprint World Championships medalists in kayak